is a railway station on the Uetsu Main Line in the city of Murakami, Niigata, Japan, operated by East Japan Railway Company (JR East).

Lines
Majima Station is served by the Uetsu Main Line, and is 66.5 kilometers from the starting point of the line at Niitsu Station.

Station layout
The station consists of one ground-level side platform and one island platform connected by a level crossing. The station is unattended.

Platforms

History
Majima Station opened on 31 July 1924. With the privatization of Japanese National Railways (JNR) on 1 April 1987, the station came under the control of JR East.

Surrounding area

See also
 List of railway stations in Japan

External links
 JR East station information 

Stations of East Japan Railway Company
Railway stations in Niigata Prefecture
Uetsu Main Line
Railway stations in Japan opened in 1924
Murakami, Niigata